Ibrahim Sultan (Shawwāl 796 AH/August 1394 AD –  Shawwāl 838 AH/ May 1435 AD)  was a Timurid prince who governed a region around modern Fars from 1415 to 1435 under his father Shah Rukh. He was grandson of the conqueror Timur and died on 3 April 1435, around twelve years before his father. He is known as an artist and calligrapher, as well as the patron of Sharaf ad-Din Ali Yazdi's biography of Timur.

Ibrahim Sultan was an accomplished artist, avid calligrapher and great collector of books. Known to be observant in matters of religion, he personally scribed pious inscriptions on two madrasas he founded in Shiraz and at least five copies of the Qur'an.
There remains a handwritten Qur'an in two volumes by him written in Naskh script. Every page of this Qur'an, finished in June 1427, has profusely decorated margins of floral scrolls in gold and color. This two-part Qur'an is a splendid example of lavish manuscript production in the early Timurid period. They were stored in a small room on top of the Qur'an Gate in Shiraz. Travelers passing underneath the gates were believed to receive the blessing of the Holy Book as they began their trip or journey from Shiraz. In 1937 the two Qur'ans were taken from the gate and were taken to the Pars Museum in Shiraz, where they remain today. Sultan Ibrahim is also said to have repaired the Masjid-i Atiq but that soon thereafter it was again ruined by an earthquake.

Personal life
Consorts
Ibrahim had four wives:
Mihr Sultan Agha, daughter of Alu Chuhra Sariktash;
Fatima Sultan Agha, daughter of Amirak Qauchin;
Jahan Begi Agha, daughter of Abdullah Taifi;
Begi Sultan Agha, daughter of Bayazid Sywish;

Sons
Ibrahim had four sons:
Sultan Ishaq Mirza - with Fatima Sultan Agha;
Sultan Muhammad Mirza - with Jahan Begi Agha;
Ismail Mirza - with Begi Sultan Agha;
Sultan Abdallah Mirza - with Mihr Sultan Agha;

Daughters
Ibrahim had two daughters:
Ruqaiya Begi Begum - with Mihr Sultan Agha;
Zainab Sultan Begum - with Fatima Sultan Agha;

See also
Qur'an Gate

References

Further reading
 

Timurid dynasty
Year of birth unknown
1435 deaths